The Hanriot HD.7 was a French fighter prototype of the 1910s.

Development
The HD.7 was based largely on the Hanriot HD.3, using the wings and tail surfaces from the earlier model. A single-seat fighter, it first flew in 1918

Operational history
The aircraft was designed to replace the SPAD S.XIII fighter. However, after its first flight in 1918, it was found to be of good performance, but inferior to its main competitor, the Nieuport-Delage NiD 29, which then entered service production for the Aéronautique Militaire in 1918. No further production occurred.

Specifications

References

 

1910s French fighter aircraft
Hanriot aircraft
Aircraft first flown in 1918